Jeremy LaFaver was an American Politician, a Democrat. He served in the Missouri House of Representatives from 2013 to 2017, succeeded by Greg Razer. He did not seek re-election in 2016.

References 

1978 births
Living people
Democratic Party members of the Missouri House of Representatives